Jens Pühse (born 22 January 1972) is an extreme right-wing German politician from Wilhelmshaven. He is a member of the German National Democratic Party (NPD).

In 1987 he became a member of the Junge Nationaldemokraten (JN), but he left the organization in 1990 because he perceived it to be too liberal. Subsequently, he joined the Nationalistische Front (NF) until it was banned by the government in November 1992. In 1994 he came back to JN and he became the leader of NPD Freising in 1997. In the 2004 Landtag election in Saxony he acquired 6.3% of the votes.

References 

 Tonträger für Deutschland. "Das NPD-Bundesvorstandsmitglied Jens Pühse ist vor Gericht noch einmal günstig davongekommen." Jungle World vom 31 March 1999. https://web.archive.org/web/20070930033540/http://www.nadir.org/nadir/periodika/jungle_world/_99/14/22c.htm

1972 births
Living people
People from Wilhelmshaven